Marco Cavicchioli (born 31 January 1969 in Biella) is an Italian politician.

He is a member of the Democratic Party and he was elected Mayor of Biella on 8 June 2014 and took office on 10 June. Cavicchioli ran for a second term at the 2019 Italian local elections, but he was not re-elected.

See also
2014 Italian local elections
List of mayors of Biella

References

External links
 
 

1969 births
Living people
Mayors of Biella
Democratic Party (Italy) politicians